The list of subcamps of Mittelbau identifies locations of Konzentrationslager Mittelbau (Central Construction).  The location of the KZ Mittelbau headquarters was originally only the Block 17/3 Buchenwald subcamp, but at the end of September 1944 the SS administration ordered the camp to become the center of a complex separate from the Buchenwald concentration camp.  KZ Mittelbau became operational on November 1, 1944 with 32,471 prisoners.

Alfred
Artern
Ballenstedt
Blankenburg
Dora
Ellrich
Großwerther
Harzungen
Hohlstedt
Ilfield
Ilsenburg
Kelbra
Kleinbodungen
Langenstein-Zwieberge
Niedersachswerfen
Nordhausen (Boelcke-Kaserne)
Osterode am Harz
Rossla
Rottleberode
Salza/Thüringen
Sangerhausen
Sollstedt
Wieda
Woffleben

Construction labor teams that detained Poles
Baubrigade 4
Baubrigade 7
Baubrigade I
Baubrigade III
Baubrigade IV
Baubrigade V - West
Baubrigade VI

References

Subcamps
Nazi-related lists

it:Campo di concentramento di Dora-Mittelbau#Lista dei sottocampi di Mittelbau-Dora